Mazda Palace may refer to multiple indoor arenas in Italy:

Mazda Palace (Milan), also known as Palatrussardi and PalaSharp
Mazda Palace (Torino), also known as PalaTorino and PalaStampa
Mazda Palace (Genoa), also known as Vaillant Palace